Los cuatro Juanes is a 1966 Mexican drama film directed by Miguel Zacarías.

Cast
Luis Aguilar as Juan sin Miedo
Antonio Aguilar as Juan Colorado
Javier Solís as Juan Pístolas
Narciso Busquets as Juan Charrasqueado
Alma Delia Fuentes as Soledad
Ofelia Montesco as La Jarocha
Rosario Gálvez as Sabina
Graciela Lara as Irene
Conrado Cortés as Teniente Sandoval
Antonio Raxel as Coronel Jiménez Rangel
Jorge Russek as Capitán

References

External links

Mexican drama films
1960s Spanish-language films
1960s Mexican films